Moira Jane Sinise (née Harris; born April 19, 1954) is a retired American actress.

Biography
Harris was born in Pontiac, Illinois, and is a Roman Catholic convert. She graduated from Illinois State University in Normal. During her college years, she met her husband, Gary Sinise, and they have been married since 1981. They have three children.

Career
Harris has appeared in such films as One More Saturday Night, Of Mice and Men (directed by and co-starring her husband), and Terminator 3: Rise of the Machines. She also played the evil trucker's wife in the Kurt Russell movie Breakdown. She has made a guest appearances on the TV shows Karen Sisco, The Equalizer, and Crime Story.  At one time, she was a member of the Steppenwolf Theatre Company that Gary Sinise was instrumental in establishing. In 1987 she won a Chicago / Midwest Emmy Award for her role in Murder in Green Meadows. She also starred in Disney's Tall Tale in 1995. Harris retired in 2003, although she briefly returned to the stage in 2013, appearing in Harold Pinter's The Birthday Party at Steppenwolf.

Filmography
 Welcome Home, Bobby (1986) (TV movie) - Ann Marie
 The Fantasist (1986) - Patricia Teeling 
 One More Saturday Night (1986) - Peggy
Crime Story (1986) (TV series) - Dressler's Wife
The Equalizer (1987) (TV series) - Linda
 Miles from Home (1988) - Frank's Girl (uncredited)
 Of Mice and Men (1992) - Girl in Red Dress 
 Between Love and Hate (1993) (TV) - Katherine Templeton
 Nannie & Alex (1995) - Nonnie's Mother
 Tall Tale (1995) - Sarah Hackett
 Three Wishes (1995) - Katherine Holman
 Breakdown (1997) - Arleen Barr
 Chicago Cab (1997) - Religious Mother 
Steppenwolf Theatre Company: 25 Years on the Edge (2000) (Documentary) - Herself
 Terminator 3: Rise of the Machines (2003) - Betsy
Karen Sisco (2003) (TV series) - The Waitress
Lt. Dan Band: For the Common Good (2011) (Documentary) - Herself

References

External links

 

1954 births
Actresses from Illinois
American film actresses
American stage actresses
American television actresses
Converts to Roman Catholicism
Emmy Award winners
Illinois State University alumni
People from Pontiac, Illinois
Living people
20th-century American actresses
21st-century American actresses
Steppenwolf Theatre Company players
Catholics from Illinois